Rishabh Rajendra Pant (born 4 October 1997) is an Indian international cricketer who plays for the Indian cricket team as a wicket-keeper batter. Having played all formats for India, he is best known for his consistency to score runs in Test cricket. Pant plays for Delhi in domestic cricket and captains Delhi Capitals in the Indian Premier League. He was the vice-captain of the India U-19 team that was runner up at the 2016 Under-19 Cricket World Cup.

He made his Twenty20 International (T20I) debut for India in January 2017, his Test debut in August 2018, and his One Day International (ODI) debut in October 2018. In January 2019, Pant was named the ICC Men's Emerging Cricketer of the Year at the 2018 ICC Awards. In February 2021, Pant was named the Men's Player of the Month in the first edition of the ICC Player of the Month Awards.

In June 2022, Pant was named as the Indian captain for the T20I series against South Africa, after the designated captain KL Rahul was ruled of the series due to an injury.

Early and personal life
Rishabh Pant was born in Roorkee, Uttarakhand, India to Rajendra Pant and Saroj Pant. At the age of 12, Pant would travel with his mother to Delhi during the weekends to train with Tarak Sinha at the Sonnet Cricket Academy. He and his mother stayed at a Gurdwara in Moti Bagh as they did not have suitable accommodation in the city.

Sinha suggested Pant switch to Rajasthan to play U-13 and U-15 cricket but to no avail. Pant was instructed by his mentor to overhaul his entire batting technique in the hopes of becoming a better batsman. His turning point came when he was playing U-19 cricket for Delhi against Assam. Pant had top-scored with 35 in his first innings and then hit 150 in the second innings, which he claims was the most important knock in his career.

On 1 February 2016, during the 2016 Under-19 Cricket World Cup, Pant hit an 18-ball fifty against Nepal, the fastest at this level.

Rishabh's father died in April 2017, due to a cardiac arrest.

Domestic career
Pant made his first-class debut on 22 October 2015 in the 2015–16 Ranji Trophy and his List A debut the next month in the 2015–16 Vijay Hazare Trophy.

In the 2016–17 Ranji Trophy, while playing a match against Maharashtra, Pant scored 308 runs in an innings, becoming the third-youngest Indian to score a triple century in first-class cricket.

On 8 November 2016, Pant scored the fastest century in the Ranji Trophy, from just 48 balls, in Delhi's match against Jharkhand.

In February 2017, Pant was named Delhi's captain for the 2016–17 Vijay Hazare Trophy. He took over from Gautam Gambhir, who led Delhi to the final of the previous season. Delhi coach Bhaskar Pillai said it was a "consensus decision" to prepare Pant for the future.

On 14 January 2018, in the 2017–18 Zonal T20 League match between Himachal Pradesh and Delhi, Pant scored the second-fastest century in a Twenty20 match, making 100 from 32 balls.

Indian Premier League
Pant was purchased by the Delhi Daredevils ahead of the 2016 Indian Premier League on the same day he scored a century for India U-19 team in the 2016 Under-19 Cricket World Cup, guiding them into the semi-finals. Playing his third game of the season, Pant made 69 runs off 40 balls to help Delhi secure an eight-wicket victory over Gujarat Lions. In the 2017 season, he scored 97 runs from 43 balls against the same team.

During the 2018 Indian Premier League, Pant scored an unbeaten 128 from 63 balls against the Sunrisers Hyderabad, making it the then highest individual score by an Indian cricketer in IPL history. He also became the second youngest player to score a century in the IPL. In March 2021, Pant was named the captain of the Delhi Capitals for the 2021 Indian Premier League after the regular captain Shreyas Iyer was ruled out of the entire tournament due to an injury. He was retained as captain for the 2022 IPL season as well.

International career

Early years (2017–19) 

In January 2017, Pant was named in India's Twenty20 International (T20I) squad for their series against England. He made his debut for India in the third T20I against England at the M. Chinnaswamy Stadium, Bangalore on 1 February 2017. Pant was the then youngest player to debut for India in a T20I match at the age of 19 years 120 days.

In February 2018, he was named in India's T20I squad for the 2018 Nidahas Trophy. In July 2018, Pant was named in India's Test squad for the series against England. He made his Test debut against England on 18 August 2018. He became the first batter for India to get off the mark in Test cricket with a six in the series. On 11 September 2018, Pant scored his maiden Test century, against England also becoming the second-youngest wicket-keeper and the first Indian wicket-keeper to score a Test century in England. The following month, he was named in India's One Day International (ODI) squad for their series against the West Indies. He made his ODI debut for India against the West Indies on 21 October 2018.

In December 2018, during the first Test against Australia, Pant took eleven catches, the most by a wicket-keeper for India in a Test match. In January 2019, during the fourth Test against Australia, Pant became the first wicket-keeper for India to score a century in a Test match in Australia.

In June 2019, Pant was called up to India's squad at the 2019 Cricket World Cup as a replacement for Shikhar Dhawan, who suffered a hairline fracture of his left thumb during India's game against Australia. Following the World Cup, the International Cricket Council (ICC) named Pant as the rising star of the squad.

In September 2019, during the second Test against the West Indies, Pant became the fastest wicket-keeper for India to affect fifty dismissals in Test cricket. In January 2021, during the fourth Test against Australia, Pant became the fastest wicket-keeper for India to reach 1,000 runs in Test cricket.

Form slump (2019–20) 
The 2019–20 home season was billed as an important season for Pant with MS Dhoni announcing a hiatus from international cricket. India went into the season in search of a new wicket-keeping mainstay with Pant as one of the front-runners. However, ordinary performances from the left-hander and the emergence of KL Rahul as a wicket-keeping option meant that Pant slipped down the pecking order.

A dismal show in the 2020 IPL season didn't help either. Pant, who had scored a cumulative 1172 runs with a strike rate of 168 in the last two seasons, only managed to amass 343 runs with a strike rate of 113. His only fifty came in the finals in a losing cause.

Pant was consequently dropped from the limited-overs team touring Australia in 2020–21. He, however, kept his place in the Test team but did not make it to the playing eleven of the first Test in Adelaide.

During this period, Pant was heavily criticized by fans and the media. Disdainful comparisons with Indian cricket legend MS Dhoni were often brought up. There were instances of the crowd chanting "Dhoni! Dhoni!" when Pant made a mistake on the field.

Return to form (2021–present) 
India was bowled out for 36 in the second innings of the first Test of the Border Gavaskar Trophy 2020–21 and hence lost the test by 8 wickets despite getting a healthy first-innings lead. Following this, Rishabh Pant was picked ahead of Wriddhiman Saha for the second test in Melbourne.

While Pant scored 29 in the first innings of the Melbourne Test, it was at Sydney that he played a career-changing knock. With 97 overs to survive on the last day, he played a counter-attacking knock of 97 runs off just 118 balls, also putting up a 148-run partnership with Cheteshwar Pujara. The match ultimately ended in a draw.

India had many first-choice players unavailable due to injury, and were the underdogs going into the match played in The Gabba where Australia had not been defeated since 1988. Pant put in a match-winning performance on day five, as India chased down a target of 328 in the fourth innings, scoring an unbeaten 89.

In September 2021, Pant was named in India's squad for the 2021 ICC Men's T20 World Cup. At the annual ICC Awards in January 2022, Pant was named in ICC Men's Test Team of the Year for 2021. In March 2022, during the second match against Sri Lanka, Pant scored the fastest half-century by a batter for India in a Test match, breaking the record previously held by Kapil Dev. He brought up his half-century in just 28 deliveries.

In May 2022, Pant was named as the vice-captain of the Indian team for the South Africa tour of India 2022 series. However, one day before the first match of the series, Pant was named as the captain, after India's captain KL Rahul was ruled of the series out due to an injury. At the age of 24 years and 248 days, Pant became the second-youngest captain to lead India in a T20I match.

In July 2022, in the final match of India's tour of England, Pant recorded his maiden century in ODI cricket scoring 125 runs and remaining not out.

2022 Car Accident
On 30 December 2022, Pant was involved in a near-fatal car crash in Delhi-Dehradun highway near Roorkee. He was cleared of any serious injury and he remains stable despite sustaining injuries to his head, back and feet and also sustained two cuts on his forehead, a ligament tear in his right knee and has also hurt his right wrist, ankle, toe and has also suffered abrasion injuries on his back. He was initially admitted to Saksham Hospital which is near New Delhi and he was transferred to Max Hospital in Dehradun. The MRI scans of his brain and spine indicated that they are normal but he is advised to undergo a plastic surgery for his facial injuries, lacerated wounds and abrasions while scans of his ankle and knee were postponed to a later date due to Pant complaining about pain and swelling.

He had reportedly driven his Mercedes SUV car from Roorkee to New Delhi and he was the only person inside the car according to eye-witnesses. His car reportedly caught fire when it collided with the central divider on the road and the incident was reported to have took place at morning 5.30 am and his car skidded for around 200 meters before hitting the road divider. Some sources claimed that Pant may have slept while driving. Pant was rescued by Sushil Kumar, a bus driver and Paramjeet Singh, the bus conductor both employees of Haryana Roadways.

See also
 List of Ranji Trophy triple centuries

References

External links
 

1997 births
Living people
Indian cricketers
India Test cricketers
India One Day International cricketers
India Twenty20 International cricketers
Delhi cricketers
Delhi Capitals cricketers
India Red cricketers
Indian A cricketers
People from Haridwar district
Cricketers from Uttarakhand
Cricketers at the 2019 Cricket World Cup
Wicket-keepers